is Emperor of Japan. He acceded to the Chrysanthemum Throne on 1 May 2019, beginning the Reiwa era, following the abdication of his father, Akihito. He is the 126th monarch according to Japan's traditional order of succession.

Naruhito was born in Tokyo during the reign of his grandfather Hirohito as the eldest child of Crown Prince Akihito and Crown Princess Michiko. Emperor Hirohito died in 1989, at which point Akihito became emperor and Naruhito became the heir apparent. Naruhito was formally invested as crown prince in 1991. He attended Gakushūin schools in Tokyo and later studied history at Gakushuin University and English at Merton College, Oxford. In 1993, he married Harvard graduate and diplomat Masako Owada. They have one daughter, Aiko, Princess Toshi.

Continuing his grandfather's and father's boycott over the enshrinement of convicted war criminals, Naruhito has never visited Yasukuni Shrine. He is interested in water policy and water conservation and likes to play the viola. He was an honorary president of the 2020 Summer Olympics and 2020 Summer Paralympics and is a supporter of the World Organization of the Scout Movement.

Name 
Before becoming emperor, Naruhito was generally referred in the Japanese press by his given name and princely title. The era of Naruhito's reign bears the name  , and according to custom he will be renamed  by order of the Cabinet after his death.

The name of the next era under his successor will be established after his death or before his abdication.

Early life 

Naruhito was born on 23 February 1960 at 4:15 p.m. in the Imperial Household Agency Hospital in Tokyo Imperial Palace. As a prince, he later quipped, "I was born in a barn inside the moat". His parents, Akihito and Michiko, were then crown prince and crown princess of Japan, while his paternal grandfather, Emperor Shōwa, reigned as emperor. Reuters reported that Naruhito's paternal grandmother, Empress Kōjun, had driven her daughter-in-law and grandchildren to depression in the 1960s by persistently accusing Michiko of not being suitable for her son.

Naruhito's childhood was reported to be happy, and he enjoyed activities such as mountain climbing, riding, and learning the violin. He played with the children of the royal chamberlain, and he was a fan of the Yomiuri Giants in the Central League, his favorite player being No. 3, later team manager, Shigeo Nagashima. One day, Naruhito found the remains of an ancient roadway on the palace grounds, sparking a lifelong fascination with the history of transportation, which would provide the subject of his bachelor's and master's degrees in history. He later said, "I have had a keen interest in roads since childhood. On roads, you can go to the unknown world. Since I have been leading a life where I have few chances to go out freely, roads are a precious bridge to the unknown world, so to speak."

In August 1974, when the prince was 14, he was sent to Melbourne, Australia, for a homestay. Naruhito's father, then the Crown Prince Akihito, had had a positive experience there on a trip the year before and encouraged his son to go as well. He stayed with the family of businessman Colin Harper. He got along with his host brothers, riding around Point Lonsdale, playing the violin and tennis, and climbing Uluru together. Once he even played the violin for dignitaries at a state dinner at Government House hosted by Governor-General Sir John Kerr.

Education 

When Naruhito was four years old he was enrolled in the prestigious Gakushūin school system, where many of Japan's elite families and narikin (nouveaux riches) send their children. In senior high, Naruhito joined the geography club.

Naruhito graduated from Gakushuin University in March 1982 with a Bachelor of Letters degree in history. In July 1983, Naruhito undertook a three-month intensive English course before entering Merton College, Oxford University, in the United Kingdom, where he studied until 1986. Naruhito did not, however, submit his thesis A Study of Navigation and Traffic on the Upper Thames in the 18th Century until 1989. He later revisited these years in his book, The Thames and I – a Memoir of Two Years at Oxford. He visited some 21 historic pubs, including the Trout Inn. Naruhito joined the Japan Society and the drama society, and became the honorary president of the karate and judo clubs. He played inter-college tennis, seeded number three out of six on the Merton team, and took golf lessons from a pro. In his three years at Merton he also climbed the highest peaks in three of the constituent countries of the United Kingdom: Scotland's Ben Nevis, Wales's Snowdon and Scafell Pike in England.

While at Oxford, Naruhito also was able to go sightseeing across Europe and meet much of its royalty, including the British royal family. The relatively relaxed manners of the United Kingdom's royals amazed him: "Queen Elizabeth II, he noted with surprise, poured her own tea and served the sandwiches." He also went skiing with Liechtenstein's Prince Hans-Adam II, holidayed in Mallorca in the Mediterranean with Spain's King Juan Carlos I, and sailed with Norway's Crown Prince Harald and Crown Princess Sonja and Queen Beatrix of the Netherlands.

Upon his return to Japan, Naruhito enrolled once more in Gakushūin University to earn a Master of Humanities degree in history, successfully earning his degree in 1988.

Personal life

Marriage and family 

Naruhito first met Masako Owada (staff working at the Ministry of Foreign Affairs) at a tea for Infanta Elena of Spain in November 1986, during her studies at the University of Tokyo. The prince was immediately captivated by her, and arranged for them to meet several times over the next few weeks. Because of this, they were pursued relentlessly by the press throughout 1987.

Despite the Imperial Household Agency's disapproval of Masako Owada, and her attending Balliol College, Oxford, for the next two years, Naruhito remained interested in Masako. He proposed to her three times before the Imperial Palace announced their engagement on 19 January 1993. The wedding took place on 9 June the same year at the Imperial Shinto Hall in Tokyo before 800 invited guests, including many of Europe's heads of state and royalty.

By the time of their marriage, Naruhito's father had ascended the throne, so Naruhito had been invested as the crown prince with the title  on 23 February 1991.

Masako's first pregnancy was announced in December 1999, but she miscarried. Emperor Naruhito and Empress Masako have one daughter, born 1 December 2001 at the Imperial Household Agency Hospital in Tokyo Imperial Palace.

Hobbies and interests 
Naruhito is interested in water policy and water conservation. In March 2003, in his capacity as honorary president of the Third World Water Forum, he delivered a speech at the forum's opening ceremony titled "Waterways Connecting Kyoto and Local Regions". Visiting Mexico in March 2006, he gave the keynote address at the opening ceremony for the Fourth World Water Forum, "Edo and Water Transport". And in December 2007, he gave a commemorative talk at the opening ceremony for the First Asia-Pacific Water Summit, "Humans and Water: From Japan to the Asia-Pacific Region".

Naruhito plays the viola, having switched from the violin because he thought the latter "too much of a leader, too prominent" to suit his musical and personal tastes. He enjoys jogging, hiking, and mountaineering in his spare time.

Crown Prince of Japan

The Crown Prince was a patron of the 1998 Winter Olympics and 1998 Winter Paralympics. He is also a supporter of the World Organization of the Scout Movement and in 2006 attended the 14th Nippon Jamboree, the Japanese national jamboree organized by the Scout Association of Japan. The crown prince has also been an honorary vice-president of the Japanese Red Cross Society since 1994. In 2001, the Crown Prince visited the United Kingdom; he met Queen Elizabeth II and Prince Philip, Duke of Edinburgh at Windsor Castle.

For two weeks in 2012, Naruhito temporarily took charge of his father's duties while the Emperor underwent and recovered from heart bypass surgery. Naruhito's birthday was named "Mount Fuji Day" by Shizuoka and Yamanashi Prefectures because of his reported love of the mountain.

Emperor of Japan

On 1 December 2017, the government announced that Naruhito's father, Emperor Akihito, would abdicate on 30 April 2019, and that Naruhito would become the 126th emperor of Japan as of 1 May 2019. Following an abdication ceremony on the afternoon of 30 April, Akihito's reign and the Heisei era continued until the end of the day. Naruhito then succeeded him as emperor at the beginning of the day on 1 May, ushering in the Reiwa era. The transition took place at midnight, and Naruhito formally began his reign in a ceremony later that morning. In his first statement as emperor, he pledged to reflect deeply on the course followed by his father, and fulfill his constitutional responsibility "as the symbol of the state and of the unity of the people of Japan".

Under Article 4 of the Constitution, Naruhito's role is defined as entirely ceremonial and representative, without even nominal powers related to government; he is barred from making political statements. His role is limited to performing ceremonial duties as delineated by the Constitution, and even then he is constrained by the requirements of the Constitution and the binding advice of the Cabinet. For instance, while he formally appoints the prime minister, he is required to appoint the person designated by the National Diet.

Naruhito's enthronement ceremony took place on 22 October 2019, where he was duly enthroned in an ancient-style proclamation ceremony. On 23 July 2021, Naruhito opened the 2020 Summer Olympics (originally scheduled to be played in 2020, postponed by the COVID-19 pandemic) hosted in Tokyo, just as his grandfather, Emperor Shōwa, had done in 1964.

Naruhito and Masako's first trip abroad as Emperor and Empress took place in September 2022, to the United Kingdom to attend the state funeral of Queen Elizabeth II.

Selected works 

 1993 – 
 2006 – The Thames and I: A Memoir of Two Years at Oxford with Hugh Cortazzi. Folkestone, Kent: Global Oriental. ;

Honours

Titles and styles
23 February 1960 – 7 January 1989: Naruhito, His Imperial Highness Prince Hiro (浩宮徳仁親王殿下 Hiro-no-miya Naruhito shinnō denka)
7 January 1989 – 30 April 2019: His Imperial Highness The Crown Prince of Japan (日本の皇太子殿下 Nihon no kōtaishi denka)
1 May 2019 – present: His Majesty The Emperor (天皇陛下 Ten'nō heika)

National 
  Collar of the Supreme Order of the Chrysanthemum (1 May 2019)
  Grand Cordon of the Supreme Order of the Chrysanthemum (23 February 1980)
  Grand Cordon of the Order of the Paulownia Flowers (1 May 2019)
  Grand Cordon of the Order of the Sacred Treasure (1 May 2019) 
  The Order of Culture (1 May 2019)
  The Golden Pheasant Award of the Scout Association of Japan (1989)
  The Golden Medal of Merit of the Japanese Red Cross (1 May 2019)
  The Golden Medal of Honorary Member of the Japanese Red Cross (1 May 2019)

Foreign 
 : Grand Decoration of Honour in Gold with Sash for Services to the Republic of Austria (1999) 
 : Grand Cross of the Order of Leopold
 : Knight of the Order of the Elephant (R.E., 2004)
 : Grand Cross 1st Class of the Order of Merit of the Federal Republic of Germany
 : Grand Cross of the Order of Merit of the Republic of Hungary (2000) 
 : Knight Grand Cross of the Order of Merit of the Italian Republic (1982)
 : Grand Cordon of the Supreme Order of the Renaissance (1995)
 : Knight of the Order of the Gold Lion of the House of Nassau (2017)
 : Honorary Grand Commander of the Order of the Defender of the Realm (S.M.N., 2012)
 :
 Grand Cross of the Order of the Crown (1991)
 Recipient of the King Willem-Alexander Inauguration Medal (2013)
 : Knight Grand Cross of the Order of St. Olav (26/03/2001)
 : Grand Collar of the Order of Sikatuna, Rank of Raja (3 December 2002)
 : Grand Cross of the Order of Christ (02/12/1993)
 : Knight Grand Cross of the Order of Charles III (08/11/2008)
 : Knight of the Order of the Seraphim (26/03/2007)
 :
 Knight Grand Cross with Collar of the Order of the Crown of Tonga (01/08/2008)
 Coronation Medal of H.M. King George Tupou V (01/08/2008)
 Coronation Medal of H.M. King Tupou VI (4 July 2015)
 : Member First Class of the Order of Zayed (23/01/1995)

Honorary degrees 
 University of Oxford, Doctor of Law

References

Sources

External links 

 Their Majesties the Emperor and Empress at the Imperial Household Agency website

1960 births
21st-century Japanese monarchs
Alumni of Merton College, Oxford
Gakushuin University alumni
Japanese emperors
Japanese princes
Living people
People from Tokyo
Reiwa period
Sons of emperors

Grand Crosses of the Order of Christ (Portugal)
Grand Crosses of the Order of Merit of the Republic of Hungary (civil)
Grand Crosses of the Order of the Crown (Netherlands)
Knights Grand Cross of the Order of Merit of the Italian Republic
Knights Grand Cross of the Order of the Crown of Tonga
Recipients of the Grand Decoration with Sash for Services to the Republic of Austria